Ioannis Karamalegkos (alternative spellings: Giannis, Yiannis, Karamalegos) (Greek: Ιωάννης Καραμαλέγκος; born 19 September 1994 in Maroussi, Athens, Greece) is a Greek professional basketball player. He is 1.92 m (6 ft 3 " in) tall, and he can play at both the point guard and shooting guard positions.

Professional career
Karamalegkos began his professional career with the Greek Basket League club Panathinaikos Athens in 2009. He was a member of the Panathinaikos team that won the EuroLeague championship in 2011. After that, he signed with Amyntas.  In 2013, he signed with Arkadikos.

He moved to Kastorias in 2017.

National team career
Karamalegkos was a member of the junior national teams of Greece. With Greece's junior national teams he played at the 2010 FIBA Europe Under-16 Championship, the 2012 FIBA Europe Under-18 Championship, and the 2013 FIBA Europe Under-20 Championship.

See also 
 List of youngest EuroLeague players

References

External links
FIBA Profile
FIBA Europe Profile
Euroleague.net Profile
Greek Basket League Profile 
Arkadikos Team Profile 
Eurobasket.com Profile
Draftexpress.com Profile
BGBasket.com Profile

1994 births
Living people
Amyntas B.C. players
Arkadikos B.C. players
Greek men's basketball players
Kastorias B.C. players
Pagrati B.C. players
Panathinaikos B.C. players
Panionios B.C. players
Point guards
Shooting guards
Basketball players from Athens